"Tattoo" is the first song and single from the album, A Different Kind of Truth, from American hard rock band Van Halen. The single was released online and to radio stations January 10, 2012.

History
The song's structure is based largely on a song entitled "Down in Flames", which was written in 1977 and played live by Van Halen during their club days as well as their first world tour in 1978. When the band decided to cover Clint Ballard Jr.'s song "You're No Good" for their second album, Van Halen II, they incorporated the intro from "Down in Flames" as the intro to their arrangement.

A version of the song was worked on during the aborted 2001 reunion with Roth according to Ray Luzier.

"Tattoo" became Van Halen's first single to chart on the American Billboard Hot 100 in 17 years, and their 23rd overall.

Music video 
The music video was shot at the Roxy Theatre, Sunset Strip in West Hollywood, California while rehearsing for their then upcoming tour in late 2011. Their performance was shot in black and white and starts with a big waving checkered racing flag and ending with a hail of confetti and balloons. The song also features reverse effects and other computer special effects. It is their first music video with David Lee Roth in almost 30 years, their first music video without Michael Anthony, and their first featuring Wolfgang Van Halen. The video was uploaded to YouTube on January 10, 2012, the same day of the single's release.

Release
A 30-second "teaser" clip of the song was posted on January 6, 2012. The official single release was announced as January 10 after Van Halen played an intimate club gig at the Cafe Wha?

Personnel
David Lee Roth – lead vocals, synthesizer
Eddie Van Halen – guitar,  backing vocals
Alex Van Halen – drums
Wolfgang Van Halen – bass guitar, backing vocals

Chart positions

References

Van Halen songs
2012 singles
Interscope Records singles
Songs written by Eddie Van Halen
Songs written by David Lee Roth
Songs written by Alex Van Halen
Song recordings produced by John Shanks
2012 songs